Scott Mebus is American novelist, composer and playwright.  He has written two adult novels, Booty Nomad  and The Big Happy, and the children's urban fantasy series "Gods of Manhattan." His first musical, Tarnish, played in the NY International Fringe Festival in 2001. His latest musical, No Sympathy For The Wolf, debuted at the 2018 NY International Fringe Festival.  He also composed the theme song for the Discovery Channel Kids program, Outward Bound.

Education 
Mebus attended Hackley School, graduating in 1992. He went on to receive a BA in English from Wesleyan University.

Early work life 
Mebus was a producer at MTV, working on such shows as The Tom Green Show, The Real World, and MTV Yoga before leaving to pursue his writing career.

Published works

Adult books
Booty Nomad (2004)
The Big Happy (2006)

Children's books
Gods of Manhattan (2008)
Spirits in the Park (2009)
The Sorcerer's Secret (2010)

Short fiction
Bull In The Heather in Noise edited by Peter Wild (2009)

Musicals
Tarnish (2001)
No Sympathy For The Wolf (2018)

References

External links
Scott Mebus's Official Site

Living people
1974 births
21st-century American novelists
American male novelists
American children's writers
Wesleyan University alumni
People from Middletown, Orange County, New York
21st-century American male writers
Novelists from New York (state)